Richterswil railway station is a railway station that serves the municipality of Richterswil, in the canton of Zürich, Switzerland.  It is owned and operated by Swiss Federal Railways, and forms part of the Lake Zürich left-bank railway line. The station is situated at the south-eastern edge of the town centre, on the shore of Lake Zürich  a short distance to the south of the Zürichsee-Schifffahrtsgesellschaft (ZSG) ferry terminal.

The station building is inscribed on the Swiss Inventory of Cultural Property of National Significance (class A).

History
The station was opened in 1875, along with the rest of the Zürich HB to Ziegelbrücke section of the Lake Zürich left-bank railway line.

Facilities 
The station has two tracks, flanked by a pair of side platforms. The station building is on the platform on the landward side of the station, flanking track 1. Both platforms are connected by a pedestrian subway, which also connects to the town centre on the landward side, and the ZSG terminal on the lake side.

Services

Zürich S-Bahn 
The station is served by the following lines of the Zürich S-Bahn, operated by the Swiss Federal Railways:

 
 

The two services each operated every half-hour during the day, combining to provide four trains per hour to and from Zürich, with a journey time of between 30 and 40 minutes.

Bus services 
Three Zimmerberg bus lines call at Richterswil.

See also 

History of rail transport in Switzerland
Rail transport in Switzerland

References

External links 
 
 

Railway stations in the canton of Zürich
Swiss Federal Railways stations
Richterswil
Railway stations in Switzerland opened in 1875